Luca Andreani (born 19 April 2001) is an Italian professional rugby union player who primarily plays flanker for Zebre Parma of the United Rugby Championship.

Professional career 
Andreani previously played for clubs such as Bassa Bresciana. He signed for Zebre in July 2021 ahead of the 2021–22 United Rugby Championship.

In 2020 and 2021 Andreani was named in Italy U20s squad for the annual Six Nations Under 20s Championship.

References

External links 

2001 births
Living people
Italian rugby union players
Zebre Parma players
Rugby union flankers
People from the Province of Brescia